McCallum is a local service district and designated place in the Canadian province of Newfoundland and Labrador. It is on the southern coast of the island of Newfoundland. It is accessible only by boat or by air, and in appearance and way of life is thought by some to be as close to a pre-20th century community as may be found. McCallum lies in an enclosed harbour and is sheltered between two hills. The community survives primarily on the fishery. Whaling was also a major industry in the late 19th century. It is also about an hour and a half from the nearest road, in a community called Hermitage.

History 
McCallum takes its name from Sir Henry Edward McCallum, Colonial Governor of Newfoundland and Labrador from 1899 to 1901.

The waters around McCallum have been fished since at least the 16th century, however no permanent settlement existed until after the Seven Years' War, after 1816.  When the French gained possession of the Islands of Saint Pierre and Miquelon, the English on the Islands were forced to find new homes, and looked just north, to Newfoundland's southern coast.

It was during this time that Captain James Cook was appointed marine surveyor of Newfoundland, and mapped out in detail the coastline and waters around McCallum to create a boundary for where the French were still allowed to fish.

Aside from the traditional fishery, there is also a lobster fishery.

In recent years there has also been aquaculture in and around the community of McCallum. The lifeblood of McCallum revolves around the sea.

McCallum voted on resettlement in 2015 and 2017 but did not meet the 90% threshold required.

Geography 
McCallum is in Newfoundland within Subdivision D of Division No. 3. As a result of resettlement, the community has grown and has taken in people from surrounding communities such as Pushthrough, Muddy Hole, Indian Cove, Lock's Cove, Richards Harbour, Great Jervais and Mosquito.

Demographics 

Government 
McCallum is a local service district (LSD) that is governed by a committee responsible for the provision of certain services to the community. The chair of the LSD committee is Everett Durnford.

Infrastructure 

McCallum has a public wharf, a fire department, a bed-and-breakfast, local internet access, a ferry service to Hermitage (where the nearest road is located), and distance education facilities. There is only one general store, Fudges Store (there were two for many years until Riggs and Sons Ltd. went out of business). The church is St Peter's Anglican, and the school is St Peter's All Grade School. The school is small with only three students. Distance education is a popular means of education for the high school students (grades 9 to 12).

There are now more than four ATV's used for various jobs in the community, such as garbage pickup, hauling freight, and bringing groceries to the shop. Also, ATVs have become popular for residents needing to get various jobs done quicker. Snowmobiles are popular in winter.

See also 
Hermitage Bay
List of communities in Newfoundland and Labrador
List of designated places in Newfoundland and Labrador
List of local service districts in Newfoundland and Labrador
Resettlement (Newfoundland)

References

External links 
Ferry Schedule
The Webpage of the School in McCallum (Archived circa 2007)

Populated coastal places in Canada
Designated places in Newfoundland and Labrador
Local service districts in Newfoundland and Labrador
Road-inaccessible communities of Newfoundland and Labrador
Car-free zones in Canada
Fishing communities in Canada